The Biak white-eye (Zosterops mysorensis) is a species of bird in the family Zosteropidae. It is endemic to the islands of Biak and Supiori in West Papua, Indonesia.

Its natural habitat is subtropical or tropical moist lowland forests. It is threatened by habitat loss.

References

Birds described in 1874
Birds of the Schouten Islands
Endemic fauna of the Biak–Numfoor rain forests
Zosterops
Taxonomy articles created by Polbot